Marion Mageo, better known by the stage name Marion Malena, is a multiple beauty pageant winner who identifies as a Fa'afafine.

Malena is an American Samoan who resides in Seattle, Washington.  Malena was a Miss Island Queen Pageant titleholder in 2005 and a Miss American Sevens titleholder in 2007. Malena won several multi-ethnic transgender pageants such as Miss Gay Asian Pacific Islander International, Miss UTOPIA International, and Miss Northwest.

References

Living people
American Samoan beauty pageant winners
American Samoan LGBT people
Transgender female models
Fa'afafine
Year of birth missing (living people)